Jabal Ad-Dhoor is a mountain of Saudi Arabia located at 18°10′51″N 43°10′33″E.

Jabal al-Dour is part of the Sarawat Mountains located in the south of Saudi Arabia and is located in the north of the province of al-Namas belonging to the Asir region.

It rises by 2,521 meters (8,271 feet) above Sea level.

References

Dhoor